Ričardas Panavas (born 1 April 1972) is a Lithuanian cross-country skier. He competed at the 1992, 1994, 1998 and the 2002 Winter Olympics.

References

1972 births
Living people
Lithuanian male cross-country skiers
Olympic cross-country skiers of Lithuania
Cross-country skiers at the 1992 Winter Olympics
Cross-country skiers at the 1994 Winter Olympics
Cross-country skiers at the 1998 Winter Olympics
Cross-country skiers at the 2002 Winter Olympics
Sportspeople from Vilnius